CVB may refer to:

 Convention and Visitor Bureau, an American destination marketing organization in tourism
 Central Violations Bureau of the U.S. court system
 Camper Van Beethoven, an alternative rock band

See also
 Cosmic neutrino background (CνB, where ν is the Greek letter nu), a relic of the big bang